This is a list of notable past and present residents of the U.S. city of Irvine, California, and its surrounding metropolitan area.  For people whose only connection with the city is attending the University of California, Irvine, see: List of University of California, Irvine people.

Athletics

 Garret Anderson – Major League Baseball player
 Garrett Atkins – Major League Baseball player
 C. David Baker –  commissioner of the Arena Football League and former Irvine Council member
 Dotsie Bausch – Olympic cyclist
 Amanda Beard – Olympic swimmer
 Steve Birnbaum (born 1991) – soccer player
 Travis Brody – professional football player
 JT Daniels – quarterback for the West Virginia Mountaineers
 Lindsay Davenport – professional tennis player
 Anthony Davis – former National Football League player
 Austin Daye – National Basketball Association player
Darren Daye – former National Basketball Association player
 Eric Ebert – professional football (soccer) player
 Jim Edmonds – Major League Baseball player
 Julie Ertel – Olympic triathlete (2008 Summer Olympics) and water polo player (2000 Summer Olympics)
 Benny Feilhaber – professional soccer player
 Vince Ferragamo – formal NFL/CFL quarterback - Led Los Angeles Rams to Super Bowl appearance, 1980
 Kevin Friedland (born 1981) - soccer player
 Shawn Green – former Major League Baseball player; 2-time All-Star
 Bob Hamelin – former Major League Baseball player
 Dan Haren – Major League Baseball pitcher
Nick Hornsby (born  1995), basketball player for Hapoel Be'er Sheva in the Israeli Basketball Premier League
 Quinton Jackson – professional mixed martial arts fighter and UFC former light-heavyweight champion
 Adam Keefe – former National Basketball Association player
 Carnell Lake – five-time NFL Pro Bowl player and UCLA Bruins assistant football coach
 Mark Langston – former Major League Baseball player
 Jason Lezak – Olympic swimmer, four-time gold medal winner.
 Chris Lewis – former professional tennis player
 Chris Mandeville – former National Football League defensive back
 Michael McClune – professional tennis player
 Mark McGwire – former Major League Baseball player
 Beverly Oden – Olympic volleyball player
 Elaina Oden – Olympic volleyball player
 Kim Oden – Olympic volleyball player
 Aaron Peirsol – Olympic swimmer
 Shar Pourdanesh – former National Football League player, first Iranian-born player in NFL, starting tackle for Washington Redskins and Pittsburgh Steelers
 Chris Pronger – National Hockey League player
 Jimmy Raye – former National Football League player and offensive coordinator for the San Francisco 49ers
 Joe Sambito – retired Major League pitcher
 Monte Scheinblum – 1992 U.S. National and world long-driving champion
 Scott Spiezio – former Major League Baseball player
 Eliot Teltscher – Top-10 tennis player
 Natasha Watley – Olympic softball player
 Zack Weiss (born 1992), Major League Baseball player
 Caroline Zhang – figure skater

Literature/journalism

 Kevin Drum – political blogger for the Mother Jones magazine website
 Ezra Klein – Washington Post columnist, MSNBC contributor, blogger
 Tahereh Mafi – bestselling young adult fiction author
 Annalee Newitz – science and technology journalist
 Kira Peikoff – novelist, journalist, and daughter of Leonard Peikoff

Movies/television/media

 Omid Abtahi – actor
 Eric Anderson – actor
 Jeanne Carmen – model, pin-up girl, and actress
 Justin Chon – actor
 Jack DeSena – sketch comedy actor on Nickelodeon's All That
 Will Ferrell – actor and comedian
 Mark Haapala – producer and director
 Georgia Hardstark – actress, podcast, "My Favorite Murder"
 Hugh Hewitt – author, radio talk show host, blogger
 Ben Maller – sports radio personality
 Annie Mumolo – screenwriter actor
 Nicole Parker – comedian and actress
 Nasim Pedrad – Saturday Night Live cast member
 Jason Peoples – winner of the reality television show Average Joe (Season 1)
 Gene Polito – cinematographer and professor at USC School of Cinematic Arts
 Jim Rome – sports radio personality
 Irv Weinstein – retired television news anchor (WKBW-TV) and father of mayor Beth Krom

Music

 Joey Allen – guitarist for glam metal band Warrant
 Rebecca Black – singer/YouTuber
 Eddie Breckenridge – bassist for the post-hardcore band Thrice
 Riley Breckenridge – drummer for the post-hardcore band Thrice
 Cashis – Shady Records rapper
 Tim Commerford – Rage Against the Machine
 Zack de la Rocha – lead singer for rap metal band Rage Against the Machine
 Tom Dumont – guitarist for rock band No Doubt
 East West – Christian rapcore band
 Dustin Kensrue – vocalist and rhythm guitarist of post-hardcore band Thrice
 Martin Leung – known as the Video Game Pianist
 Geneva Lewis – violinist
 Kevin Kwan Loucks, concert pianist and arts entrepreneur
 Aubrey O'Day – singer
 Teppei Teranishi – lead guitarist of post-hardcore band Thrice
 Thrice – post-hardcore band active from 1998–Present
 Amy Yao – bassist for Riot grrrl band Emily's Sassy Lime
 Young the Giant – band
 Yeat – rapper

Politics

 Dick Ackerman – politician and former California State Senator
 Larry Agran – politician and former Irvine Council member
 John B. T. Campbell III – politician and former U.S. Congressman
 Steven Choi – politician and former Irvine Mayor
 Chuck DeVore – politician and California State Assemblyman and candidate for U.S. Senate in 2010
 Ross Johnson – politician and former California State Legislator
 Sukhee Kang – former Mayor of Irvine and former Irvine Council member
 Farrah N. Khan – current Mayor of Irvine and former Irvine Council member

Miscellaneous

 William E. Barber – Medal of Honor United States Marine Corps officer
 Larry C. Ford –  gynecologist found to have stored deadly biological toxins (including the agents of anthrax, botulism, cholera, and typhoid) in his home and office, and C4 and machine guns in his back yard
 Steve Gibson – software engineer and security journalist
 Nam Le – professional poker player
 Leonard Peikoff – Objectivist philosopher and intellectual heir to novelist-philosopher Ayn Rand
 Sudhir Alladi Venkatesh – sociologist and urban ethnographer
 Dita Von Teese – burlesque performer

References 

 
Irvine, California
Irvine